Chris Fugate (born December 28, 1969) is an American politician and Pastor who has served in the Kentucky House of Representatives from the 84th district since 2017,He also Preaches at His Church Gospel Light Baptist Church in Hazard, Ky

References

1969 births
Living people
Republican Party members of the Kentucky House of Representatives
21st-century American politicians